is a Japanese actress and model.

Kamiya is best known for her role as Satomi Noda in Battle Royale. She also played Sena in Man, Next Natural Girl: 100 Nights In Yokohama.

References

External links
 

Japanese actresses
Japanese idols
Living people
1982 births
Place of birth missing (living people)